Olaplex  is product for damaged hair developed by two chemists, Eric Presley and Craig Hawker, which is advertised as rebuilding broken bonds in hair caused by chemical, thermal, and mechanical damage.  The active ingredient of Olaplex is a chemical compound called bis-aminopropyl diglycol dimaleate.

Mechanism of action 
All Olaplex products contain a patented ingredient called bis-aminopropyl diglycol dimaleate, with the aim of rebuilding broken hair disulfide bonds. Hair's protein, keratin, contains the amino acid cysteine and cysteine contains sulfur atoms; Normally, two sulfurs form a disulfide bond and bind between two proteins, which preserves the shape and texture of the hair, and straightening, curling, and hair dye break the bonds and turn them into free thiol. The second product is set to complete the hair restoration and the third is used by the consumer	with the intention of final protection of the hair.

Ingredients 
The active ingredient of Olaplex is a chemical compound called bis-aminopropyl diglycol dimaleate.

References

Hairdressing
Hair care products
Hair coloring